Patrick Quinlan may refer to:

 Patrick Quinlan (author), American author and political activist
 Patrick Quinlan (cricketer) (1891–1935), Australian cricketer
 Patrick Quinlan (politician) (died 2001), Irish academic and politician
 Patrick L. Quinlan (1883–1948), Irish radical journalist and political activist
 Pat Quinlan (Irish Army officer) (1919–1997),  Irish Army officer who commanded the Irish UN force that fought at the Siege of Jadotville in Katanga

See also
 Quinlan (disambiguation)